Cook Hill is a mountain in Albany County, New York. It is located east of Huntersland. West Mountain is located northeast and Garver Hill is located south-southwest of Cook Hill.

References

Mountains of Albany County, New York
Mountains of New York (state)